Miu is an Austronesian language spoken by about 500 tropical forest agriculturists in the Gimi Rauto District of West New Britain Province, Papua New Guinea on the island of New Britain.

References

Pasismanua languages
Languages of West New Britain Province